The striped whipsnake (Masticophis taeniatus) is a species of nonvenomous snake in the family Colubridae. It is closely related to the California whipsnake (Masticophis lateralis). The striped whipsnake is native to the western United States and adjacent northern Mexico.

Identification
The striped whipsnake is approximately 30-72 inches (76–183 cm) in total length (including tail). This snake exhibits black, dark brown, or gray coloration on its back, often with an olive or bluish tint. Along the center of each of the first four rows of pale dorsal scales, is a dark longitudinal stripe. There is a white to cream-colored stripe down its side that is bisected by either a solid or dashed black line. The coloring on the snake's belly tends to be cream to yellowish, fading to white toward the head, and coral pink toward the tail. This snake also features a lower preocular between the upper labial scales of the mouth. The anal scale is divided.

Geographic range
The striped whipsnake is found throughout the western United States and northern Mexico. The northernmost part of its geographic range is in south central Washington, and continues southward into the Great Basin between the Cascade-Sierran crest and the continental divide. Its range then continues southeast across the continental divide into New Mexico and western and central Texas. The southernmost part of its range lies in Michoacán, Mexico. In the Western United States its range also extends outside of the Great Basin into the Rogue River Valley in southwestern Oregon and northern California. There is a population in Bryce Canyon National Park in Utah.

Habitat
The striped whipsnake is commonly found in a wide variety of habitats including shrub lands, grasslands, sagebrush flats, canyons, piñon-juniper woodlands, and open pine-oak forests. It is attracted to both permanent and seasonal rocky streams, and it frequents both flatlands and mountains.

Behavior
The species M. taeniatus is diurnal, active during the day, and is very alert and fast moving. It seeks shelter in rock outcrops, small mammal burrows, as well as in trees and shrubs depending on the habitat they occupy. This snake is nonvenomous, but it preys on a wide variety of species including lizards, other snakes (including venomous rattlesnakes), small mammals, young birds, frogs, and insects.

Reproduction
Little is known about the reproductive activities of M. taeniatus. After fertilization the female striped whipsnake will lay a clutch of 3-12 eggs, between the months of June and July, usually in an abandoned rodent burrow. One study has shown a natural incubation period of 44 to 58 days.

Subspecies
There are two subspecies of Masticophis taeniatus which are recognized as being valid, including the nominotypical subspecies.
Masticophis taeniatus girardi 
Masticophis taeniatus taeniatus 

Nota bene: A trinomial authority in parentheses indicates that the subspecies was originally described in a genus other than Masticophis.

Etymology
The subspecific name, girardi, is in honor of French-American herpetologist Charles Frédéric Girard.

References

Further reading

Baird SF, Girard C (1853). Catalogue of North American Reptiles in the Museum of the Smithsonian Institution. Part I.—Serpents. Washington, District of Columbia: Smithsonian Institution. xvi + 172 pp. (Masticophis tæniatus, p. 103).
Behler, John L.; King, F. Wayne (1979). The Audubon Society Field Guide to North American Reptiles and Amphibians. New York: Alfred A. Knopf. 743 pp., 657 plates. (Masticophis taeniatus, p. 631 + Plate 521).
Boulenger GA (1893). Catalogue of the Snakes in the British Museum (Natural History). Volume I., Containing the Families ... Colubridæ Aglyphæ, part. London: Trustees of the British Museum (Natural History). (Taylor and Francis, printers). xiii + 448 pp. + Plates I-XXVIII. (Zamenis tæniatus, pp. 390-391).
Conant, Roger, Bridges, William (1939). What Snake Is That? A Field Guide to the Snakes of the United States East of the Rocky Mountains. (With 108 drawings by Edmond Malnate). New York and London: D. Appleton-Century Company. Frontispiece map + 163 pp. + Plates A-C, 1-32. (Masticophis taeniatus girardi, pp. 50-51 + Plate 7, Figure 19A).
Hallowell E (1852). "Descriptions of new Species of Reptiles inhabiting North America". Proc. Acad. Nat. Sci. Philadelphia 6: 177-183. ("Leptophis tænita " [printer's error for Leptophis tæniata ], new species, p. 181).

Powell R, Conant R, Collins JT (2016). Peterson Field Guide to Reptiles and Amphibians of Eastern and Central North America, Fourth Edition. Boston and New York: Houghton Mifflin Harcourt. xiv + 494 pp., 47 plates, 207 figures. . (Coluber taeniatus, p. 372 + Plate 33).
Schmidt, Karl P.; Davis, D. Dwight (1941). Field Book of Snakes of the United States and Canada. New York: G.P. Putnam's Sons. 365 pp., 34 plates, 103 figures. (Coluber taeniatus, pp. 128-129, Figure 30 + Plate 14).
Smith, Hobart M.; Brodie, Edmund D., Jr. (1982). Reptiles of North America: A Guide to Field Identification. New York: Golden Press. 240 pp.  (paperback),  (hardcover). (Masticophis taeniatus, pp. 192-193).
 533 pp. . (Masticophis taeniatus, pp. 354-355 + Plate 43 + Map139).

Colubrids
Taxa named by Edward Hallowell (herpetologist)
Reptiles described in 1852